Theresa May carried out the first reshuffle of her minority government in January 2018. Following the resignation of her deputy, Damian Green as First Secretary of State in December 2017, the reshuffle had been highly anticipated and briefed in the press. There were reports of "up to a quarter" of her cabinet ministers who might lose their positions, including Boris Johnson, who had been seen to cause a number of political gaffes during his term as Foreign Secretary. The reshuffle was seen as an opportunity for the Prime Minister to reassert her authority, greatly diminished following the result of the snap general election in the previous summer. Despite being described by 10 Downing Street as a chance to "refresh" the Cabinet, few changes were made to the ministerial line-up. On 9 January, newspaper headlines reflected the chaotic nature of May's reshuffle, with The Daily Telegraph describing it as, "The Night of the Blunt Stiletto", a reference to the 1962 reshuffle carried out by Harold Macmillan.

It was widely reported Jeremy Hunt was due to be moved from the Department for Health to become Secretary of State for Business, Energy and Industrial Strategy, but refused. Instead he defended his position as Health Secretary and convinced May to allow him to remain in post, and for "Social Care" to be added to the name of his department. After considerable speculation, Justine Greening would lose her job as Education Secretary, she refused the offer of Secretary of State for Work and Pensions and chose instead to resign from the government.

Cabinet-level changes

Junior ministerial changes

Whips' Office appointments

Conservative Party appointments

Reaction
The reshuffle was widely considered a political failure, falling short of the expectation for a radical shake-up. The Guardian called it a "pointless luxury" that would cost the government, and Gary Gibbon of Channel 4 News noted it had revealed the Prime Minister's weakened position, naming the reshuffle the "Night of the Long Plastic Forks". Writing his editorial in the London Evening Standard, George Osborne credited May with orchestrating "the worst reshuffle in modern history".

Resignation of Justine Greening
Justine Greening was reported to have spent over three hours inside 10 Downing Street, discussing her political future with the Prime Minister. Despite being offered the position of Secretary of State for Work and Pensions, Greening refused to leave the Department for Education, describing it as being her "dream job". Soon after she emerged from Number 10, her formal resignation was announced and May expressed her disappointment at the decision. In a statement on Twitter, Greening wrote: "Social mobility matters to me & our country more than my ministerial career." – some thought this to be alluding to her criticism of May's grammar schools policy.

Many commentators wrote of their dismay at Greening's resignation. Melissa Benn, founder of the Local Schools Network, described her departure as "bad news for anyone who cares about education," and Stephen Bush wrote in the New Statesman that May's treatment of her Education Secretary "makes no sense at all". Bush reasoned Greening was a successful minister who did not deserve demotion to Work and Pensions, and her return to the backbench could add a vote to the bloc of anti-Brexit Tory MPs, given that she represented Putney, a heavily pro-Remain constituency. Ruth Davidson, leader of the Scottish Conservatives, praised Greening as "a real role model for LGBT+ Conservatives", and Labour MP Jonathan Reynolds tweeted that: "A Conservative Party which can find a role for Toby Young but not for Justine Greening is one that can be beaten." Faisal Islam of Sky News reported a number of Conservative MPs had privately expressed their anger at Greening's treatment, calling it a "dreadful error".

Failure to move Jeremy Hunt
Jeremy Hunt's meeting with the Prime Minister lasted over an hour, during which time Greg Clark, the Business Secretary, had arrived. Hunt and Clark were expected to swap jobs but Hunt refused, convincing Theresa May to allow him to stay at the Department and to widen his brief to include social care. May's willingness to accept Hunt's request was seen as a sign of her diminished authority, which she had hoped to improve by carrying out such a reshuffle.

Comparison were drawn between Hunt's success at persuading May to allow him to continue in his role, and Justine Greening's failure to do so. Anonymous Tory MPs were quoted as saying the Prime Minister had "caved into boys but not a woman", expanding the brief of a disloyal minister while forcing a loyal one to resign.

Renamed government departments
In the reshuffle, the Department of Health (DH) became the Department of Health and Social Care (DHSC), and the Department for Communities and Local Government (DCLG) became the Ministry of Housing, Communities and Local Government (MHCLG). It was stated by the government these changes had been made in order to reflect the government's renewed focus on housing and social care issues. Crisis, the national charity for single homeless people, tweeted its approval of the change, though others have criticised it as a rebranding exercise. It transpired the DH's name change only related to the department taking responsibility for the social care green paper that had been overseen by the Cabinet Office, rather than any representing any meaningful structural change. The Leader of the Opposition, Jeremy Corbyn, called rebranding the departments a "pointless and lacklustre PR exercise" that would not deliver real change. He stated: "You can’t make up for nearly eight years of failure by changing the name of a department."

Controversy over Maria Caulfield's appointment
The British Pregnancy Advisory Service tweeted a statement in the wake of Maria Caulfield's appointment as Vice Chairman of the Conservative Party for Women, saying they were "incredibly disappointed", due to her anti-abortion voting record. They referred specifically to her opposition to the Reproductive Health (Access to Terminations) Bill, a Ten Minute Rule bill put forward by Diana Johnson in March 2017, which proposed to end prosecutions against women who terminated their pregnancies without permission. Caulfield's appointment was also criticised by actor and activist Gillian Anderson and the leader of the Women's Equality Party, Sophie Walker, who stated: "Someone who believes (abortion rights) should be restricted can never advocate effectively for (women)."

Notable media gaffes
Even before any official announcement had been issued by Downing Street, there was criticism about the organisation and handling of the reshuffle. This narrative began with a tweet sent out by the Conservative Campaign Headquarters account, congratulating Chris Grayling on his appointment as Chairman of the Conservative Party. Although it was quickly deleted, the error soon caught the media's attention. Some mockingly suggested Grayling had broken the record for the shortest tenure as Party Chairman.

Jeremy Hunt 'liked' a tweet from Paul Staines, breaking the news of Justine Greening's resignation. Hunt swiftly apologised and insisted he had accidentally pressed the 'like' button, adding his admiration for Greening.

See also
Second May ministry
Premiership of Theresa May

Notes

References

Cabinet reshuffles in the United Kingdom
Theresa May
January 2018 events in the United Kingdom
2018 in British politics
Rishi Sunak